Crime and Justice (released on Canal+ as Crime et Justice: Nairobi) is a 2021 Kenyan Showmax Original mystery, crime, and drama series produced by Showmax and Canal+, starring Alfred Munyua, Sarah Hassan, Maqbul Mohammed, Paul Ogola, and Brian Ogola.

Plot
Crime and Justice is a police procedural and legal drama that follows the detective Makena (Hassan) and Silas (Munyua) as they investigate a one-ripped-from-the-headlines case, and safeguard the streets of Nairobi. Dealing with all manner of crime, they must learn to trust each other's instincts in the pursuit of justice.

Cast
 Sarah Hassan as Detective Makena
 Alfred Munyua as Detective Silas
 Maqbul Mohammed as DCI Boss Kebo
 Paul Ogola as Prosecutor Sokoro
 Brian Ogola as Clive

Episode

Season 1 (2021)

Season 2 (2022)

Production

Development
On 30 July 2020, Multichoice announced the partnership between Showmax and CANAL+ co-production on Blood Psalms, a drama series set to premiere on Showmax in 2021. On 12 January 2021, following their partnership, they announce the production of Crime and Justice, a crime series set in Nairobi, directed and produced by Adam Neutzsky-Wulff. Speaking about the production, CEO of MultiChoice Connected Video, Yolisa Phahle, said “MultiChoice was fundamentally an African business invested in telling African stories reflecting in the lives, languages, and cultures of the continent. We believe in African talent and look forward to shining the international spotlight on not only Kenyan stars, but the Kenyan technical industry’s capabilities, and we believe that streaming video is a powerful way to deliver these stories. This is one of many more Showmax Originals.”

Casting
The cast was reported when the first episode for season 1 began, with a line-up of Alfred Munyua, Sarah Hassan, Maqbul Mohammed, Paul Ogola, and Brian Ogola. 

Shortly after MultiChoice announce their partnership, the main cast spoke about their role during the press release. Speaking with The Media Online reporter, the lead actors Alfred Munyua, and Sarah Hassan spoke about their characters in the series, Munyua said “When I first read the script, I loved the delivery and realness of Silas as a character. It’s not exaggerated and he’s no Rambo hero; he just tackles his cases the normal way. I found a very real edge with this script, and I hope I’ll do justice to the role”. Hassan spoke about her character, saying “This is a very different character; I’ve never played anything like Makena before. It’s very exciting to get a character that makes me grow as an actor”.

Release
On 1 December 2021, Showmax renewed another season and announced they have officially begun filming. On 11 January 2022, Showmax confirmed the second season, was ready to be released in February. On 17 February 2022, Showmax held a private screening of the first episode of the second season of Crime and Justice.

Reception

Critical and audience response
In a review, Carlos Mutethi of Quartz Africa said: "Crime and Justice is based on topics that have dominated Kenyan headlines, including femicide and domestic violence." He also added, "[a]long the way, the series exposes bias and other weaknesses in the police and the judicial systems."

Awards and nominations

References

External links
  
 Crime and Justice at Showmax
 Crime et Justice : Nairobi at Canal+

2021 Kenyan television series debuts
2020s crime drama television series
English-language Showmax original programming
Kenyan drama television series